The Slickrock Trail, is a popular mountain biking destination in Grand County, Utah, United States, a few miles northeast of the city of Moab.

This   trail takes riders over a landscape of petrified sand dunes and the eroded remnants of ancient sea beds. Mountain bikers rate the Slickrock Trail as one of the more difficult rides in the Moab area, both technically and cardiovascularly.

Description

Part of the Sand Flats Recreation Area (which is managed through a partnership between Grand County and the Bureau of Land Management),  the Slickrock Trail was originally laid out in 1969 by Richard R. Wilson for use by Honda Trail 90s (before the mountain bike was invented), and the area is still open to such recreation today. 4X4 and off-road enthusiasts will find a challenge on the nearby Hell's Revenge 4X4 Trail, which intersects the Slickrock Trail in several places.

The so-called "slickrock" sandstone, which forms the majority of the trail's surface has a surface much like sandpaper, making it really grippable by the rubber tires of a mountain bike or off-road motorcycle. The texture is notorious for inflicting severe abrasion injuries.

The name "slickrock" was used by early settlers of the area to describe the sandstone because of the low traction between horses' metal shoes and the rock's sloping surfaces. The same is true today for cyclists who use shoes with metal cleats while riding the Slickrock Trail. Slickrock also becomes slick when wet.

In geological terms, the Slickrock Trail is not part of the Entrada Sandstone formation, which  includes the Slick Rock Member. Rather, most of the outcrop that forms the trail is Navajo Sandstone, and the term "slickrock" has come to mean any expanse of sandstone with a surface level enough for walking or riding.

A small fee is required to enter the Sand Flats Recreation Area. Pit-toilets are available at the trailhead, but there is no drinking water available within the area.

Permitted trail activities include mountain biking, hiking, and motorcycling. All four-wheeled vehicles are prohibited on the all of the Slickrock Trail, except those sections which intersect with the Hell's Revenge 4X4 Trail (which occurs about six times).

Course
The Slickrock Trail consists of three main sections: An out-and-back lead-in (akin to the stick of a lollipop or stem of a cherry), the  main  loop (akin to the fruit of a cherry or the candy part of a lollipop), and an optional  practice trail (also called the practice loop, although it is not literally a loop) that begins and ends at separate points on the lead-in.

The practice loop is about as hard as the rest of the trail, but it is shorter and close to the trailhead, serving for new riders as a sample of the rest of the trail or as an alternative return and or departure route.

The lead-in, main loop, and practice trail are marked out by white, dashed lines on the rock to prevent riders from straying from the trail, becoming lost, or disturbing the fragile cryptobiotic soil near which the trail passes. Trail maintainers also use yellow markings near blind drop-offs, narrow ledges, and other features to indicate to riders where to be particularly careful.

See also

Notes

References

External links

  Sand Flats Recreation Area. Visitor guide and guide to bike trails.
 Slickrock Trail on UtahMountainBiking.com. Description, map, and GPS coordinates.
 Rim Tours. Mountain Bike Tour Operator in Moab.
 Slickrock Trail on Trailforks Map, photos & conditions
 
 

Mountain biking venues in the United States
Geologic formations with imbedded sand dunes
Tourist attractions in Utah
Moab, Utah
National Recreation Trails in Utah